Noah Kareng is a Botswanan former footballer who played as a midfielder. He played one match for the Botswana national football team in 2002.

External links
 

Association football midfielders
Botswana footballers
Botswana international footballers
Living people
Mochudi Centre Chiefs SC players
Year of birth missing (living people)